"Thematic elements", or "thematic material", is a term used by the Motion Picture Association and other film ratings boards to highlight elements of a film that do not fit into the traditional categories such as violence, sex, drug use, nudity, and language, but may also involve some degree of objectionable content.  This rating reason raises a warning to parents and guardians to learn more about a film before they allow their children to view it. 

In Australia, the term is equivalent to "adult themes", "mature themes" or just "themes" (which has been in use since 2005).

Subject matter
These thematic elements may include abortion, addiction, animal cruelty, child abuse, corruption,  coming-of-age issues, non-violent crimes, death, defiance, disability (physical and/or mental), discrimination, disease, driving under the influence, dysfunctional families, dystopian societies, disasters, existential crises, hate, hazing, homelessness, gambling, infidelity, miscarriage, mental illness, politics, poverty, religion, self-harm, social issues, suicide, STDs, teenage pregnancy, truancy, verbal abuse, war and other serious subject matter or mature discussions that some parents and guardians feel may not be appropriate for their young children.

Thematic elements appear in many PG and PG-13-rated dramas and, primarily, documentary films. In addition, they can also be present in a number of animated, fantasy and romantic comedy films, and as well as psychological horror and supernatural horror films.

Examples

There are many films with moderate to heavy thematic elements. Some examples include:

Life, Animated
The Cider House Rules 
Frozen 2 
Juno 
The Aviator 
The Color Purple 
The Grudge 
Spider-Man: Into the Spider-Verse 
Finding Dory 
My Girl 
Hey Arnold!: The Movie 
My Sister's Keeper
The Curious Case of Benjamin Button 
The Hunger Games 
Warrior 
A Beautiful Mind 
Up 
Turning Red
Onward
Soul
Luca
The Patriot 
White Oleander 
42
God's Not Dead 
The Fault in Our Stars 
Isle of Dogs 
The Lion King 
The Ring 
Bridge to Teribithia 
The Deep End of the Ocean
Me Before You
What Dreams May Come
Wonder Park
UglyDolls
The Little Prince
Storks
Smallfoot
Marcel the Shell with Shoes On
Little Secrets
Hoodwinked!
The Prince of Egypt
Ron's Gone Wrong
The SpongeBob Movie: Sponge on the Run
Vivo
My Little Pony: A New Generation
Ferdinand
Detective Pikachu
Strange World
Encanto
Over The Moon
The Willoughbys
Raya and the Last Dragon

References

Film theory